Khadr or Khader, Kheder, Khidr/Khizr, Khodr, Khudr, etc. are romanizations of , an Arabic given name and surname. In surnames, it is sometimes accompanied by the definite article Al- (romanized as Al-Khodr, Al-Kheder, Al-Khudr, etc.). The Arabic word denotes the colour green, and Khidr or Al-Khidr ('the green one'), is a figure in Islam and related religions.

Khadr/Khader

People with the surname
Khadr family, Canadian family noted for their ties to Osama bin Laden and al-Qaeda
Abdulkareem Khadr (born 1989)
Abdullah Khadr (born 1981)
Abdurahman Khadr (born 1982)
Ahmed Khadr (died 2003)
Maha el-Samnah (born 1957)
Omar Khadr (born 1986)
Zaynab Khadr (born 1979)
Amanda Khadr (born 1981) 
Naser Khader (born 1963), Danish politician
Saad Khader (born 1943), Saudi actor
Samir Khader, Iraqi journalist

People with the given name
Khader Abu-Seif (born 1988), Palestinian copywriter and LGBT rights activist
Khadr El-Touni (1916–1956), Egyptian weightlifter

Places
 Khader, Fars, Iran
 al-Khader, Palestinian town west of Bethlehem, West Bank
 Hader, Syria

Kheder

People
Ferrid Kheder (born 1975), Tunisian judoka and mixed martial artist
Qusai Kheder (born 1978), also known by mononym Qusai (and Qusai aka Don Legend the Kamelion), Saudi Arabian hip hop artist

Places
Hajji Kheder, village in Samen Rural District, Samen District, Malayer County, Hamadan Province, Iran

Khidr/Khizr
Khidr or Khizr (al-Khidr, al-Khizr)
Al-Khidr, a figure in Islam
Khidr (Khan of Golden Horde) (r. 1361-1362)
Khidr Khan Surak, Suri governor of Bengal
Khizr Khan, founder of the 15th-century Sayyid dynasty
Khizr M. Khan, Pakistani American lawyer
one of the pseudonyms used by American black supremacist Dwight York

Khodr

People with the given name
Khodr Alama (born 1963), Lebanese music executive and entrepreneur

People with the surname
George Khodr, Metropolitan of Archdiocese of Mount Lebanon, Byblos and Botrys of the Greek Orthodox Church of Antioch
Jihad Khodr (born 1983), Brazilian professional surfer
Salam Khodr, Lebanese journalist and correspondent 
Zeina Khodr, international journalist and TV news correspondent

Khudr

People with the given and middle name 
Ismail Khudr Al-Shatti, Kuwaiti politician

People with the surname 
Humood AlKhudher (born 1989), Kuwaiti singer
Ahlam Khudr, Sudanese activist

Places
Sahwat al-Khudr, village in southern Syria